Bisfi is a mandal in the Madhubani district of Bihar, India. It is the birthplace of Vidyapati, a Maithili poet.

Madhubani district